Boys to Men may refer to:

 Boyz II Men, American band
 "Boys to Men" (New Edition single), 1991 single
 Ah Boys to Men (film series), film series
 From Boys to Men, book
 Boys and Men, Japanese idol group